Dia (Ancient Greek: Δία or Δῖα, "heavenly", "divine" or "she who belongs to Zeus"), in ancient Greek religion and folklore, may refer to:

 Dia, a goddess venerated at Phlius and Sicyon. She was seen by the locals as identical to Hebe and/or Ganymeda.
Dia, daughter of Aeolus, keeper of the winds and Telepora or Telepatra, daughter of Laestrygon. She was the sister of Androcles, Chrysippus, Iocastus, Phalacrus, Pheraemon, Xuthus, and the daughters' as Aeole, Astycrateia, Hephaestia, Iphthe and Periboea.
 Dia, daughter of King Porthaon of Calydon and mother of Thersites and possibly the remaining five sons by Agrius.
 Dia, daughter of the king Lycaon (thus sister of Callisto), mother of Dryops by Apollo. She concealed her new-born infant in a hollow oak tree.
 Dia, second wife of the Thracian king Phineus and by him, mother of Mariandynus and Thynus. She falsely accused of rape her step sons, Parthenius and Crambis, leading to their blindness and eventual imprisonment by Phineus.
 Dia, the Perrhaebian daughter of Deioneus or Eioneus, wife of Ixion (who killed her father so as to not pay the bride price) and with her husband, she became mother of the Lapith Pirithous, whose marriage to Hippodameia was the occasion of the Lapiths' battle with the Centaurs. According to Homer, after having sex with Zeus, who was disguised as a stallion, she gave birth to Pirithous; a folk etymology derived Pirithous' name from peritheein (περιθεῖν "to run around"), because that was what Zeus did to seduce Dia. The Jovian moon Dia is named after this Dia.
 Dia, alternate name for Hippodamia, the wife of Pirithous (thus daughter-in-law of another Dia).
Dia, mother of Pittheus by Pelops. She may have been identical with another Hippodamia, daughter of Oenomaus.

In ancient Roman religion, Dia may refer to Dea Dia.

Notes

References 

 Diodorus Siculus, The Library of History translated by Charles Henry Oldfather. Twelve volumes. Loeb Classical Library. Cambridge, Massachusetts: Harvard University Press; London: William Heinemann, Ltd. 1989. Vol. 3. Books 4.59–8. Online version at Bill Thayer's Web Site
 Diodorus Siculus, Bibliotheca Historica. Vol 1-2. Immanel Bekker. Ludwig Dindorf. Friedrich Vogel. in aedibus B. G. Teubneri. Leipzig. 1888-1890. Greek text available at the Perseus Digital Library.
 Gaius Julius Hyginus, Fabulae from The Myths of Hyginus translated and edited by Mary Grant. University of Kansas Publications in Humanistic Studies. Online version at the Topos Text Project.
 Homer, The Iliad with an English Translation by A.T. Murray, Ph.D. in two volumes. Cambridge, MA., Harvard University Press; London, William Heinemann, Ltd. 1924. Online version at the Perseus Digital Library.
 Homer, Homeri Opera in five volumes. Oxford, Oxford University Press. 1920. Greek text available at the Perseus Digital Library.
 John Tzetzes, Book of Histories, Book VII-VIII translated by Vasiliki Dogani from the original Greek of T. Kiessling's edition of 1826.  Online version at theio.com
 Nonnus of Panopolis, Dionysiaca translated by William Henry Denham Rouse (1863-1950), from the Loeb Classical Library, Cambridge, MA, Harvard University Press, 1940.  Online version at the Topos Text Project.
 Nonnus of Panopolis, Dionysiaca. 3 Vols. W.H.D. Rouse. Cambridge, MA., Harvard University Press; London, William Heinemann, Ltd. 1940-1942. Greek text available at the Perseus Digital Library.
 Pausanias, Description of Greece with an English Translation by W.H.S. Jones, Litt.D., and H.A. Ormerod, M.A., in 4 Volumes. Cambridge, MA, Harvard University Press; London, William Heinemann Ltd. 1918. Online version at the Perseus Digital Library
 Pausanias, Graeciae Descriptio. 3 vols. Leipzig, Teubner. 1903.  Greek text available at the Perseus Digital Library.
 Strabo, The Geography of Strabo. Edition by H.L. Jones. Cambridge, Mass.: Harvard University Press; London: William Heinemann, Ltd. 1924. Online version at the Perseus Digital Library.
 Strabo, Geographica edited by A. Meineke. Leipzig: Teubner. 1877. Greek text available at the Perseus Digital Library.

Greek goddesses
Mortal women of Zeus
Women of Apollo
Princesses in Greek mythology
Aetolian characters in Greek mythology
Arcadian characters in Greek mythology
Elean characters in Greek mythology
Thracian characters in Greek mythology